Telford is the surname of:

People:
Anthony Telford (born 1966), American retired Major League Baseball pitcher
Bill Telford, New Zealand rugby league player in the 1920s and coach in the '50s and '60s
Billy Telford (born 1956), English former footballer
Carly Telford (born 1987), English footballer
Dick Telford (born 1945), Australian sports scientist and former Australian rules footballer
Dom Telford (born 1996), English footballer
Don Telford (c. 1902 – c. 1980), Australian rugby union player
Erastus D. Telford (187–1936), American lawyer and politician
James Lyle Telford (1889–1960), Canadian politician, mayor of Vancouver
Katie Telford, Canadian political strategist and chief of staff to Prime Minister Justin Trudeau
Lisa Telford, Haida weaver
Mary Jewett Telford (1839–1906), American Civil War nurse and humanitarian
Robert Telford (1860–1933), Canadian pioneer and politician
Thomas Telford (1757–1834), Scottish civil engineer
William Pattison Telford, Sr. (1836–1922), Canadian banker and Member of Parliament
William Pattison Telford, Jr. (1867–1955), Canadian Member of Parliament, son of the above
Zoe Telford (born 1973), English actress

Fictional characters:
Chibs Telford, in the television series Sons of Anarchy, played by Tommy Flanagan
David Telford, in the television series Stargate Universe, played by Lou Diamond Phillips